Eunuch is a 1986 South Korean drama film directed by Lee Doo-yong. The film was selected as the South Korean entry for the Best Foreign Language Film at the 59th Academy Awards, but was not accepted as a nominee.

Cast
 Ahn Sung-ki
 Lee Mi-sook
 Namkoong Won
 Kim Jin-a
 Kil Yong-woo
 Do Kum-bong

See also
 List of submissions to the 59th Academy Awards for Best Foreign Language Film
 List of South Korean submissions for the Academy Award for Best Foreign Language Film

References

External links
 

1986 films
1986 drama films
Films directed by Lee Doo-yong
South Korean drama films
1980s Korean-language films